In mathematics, quasiregular may refer to:

 Quasiregular element, in the context of ring theory
 Quasiregular map in analysis
 Quasiregular polyhedron, in the context of geometry
 Quasiregular representation, in the context of representation theory